Cubero is the surname of:

Edwin Cubero (1924–2000), Costa Rican footballer
Fabián Cubero (born 1978), Argentine footballer
Jhonny Cubero (born 1976), Costa Rican footballer
Jonathan Cubero (born 1994), Uruguayan footballer
José María Movilla Cubero (born 1975), Spanish footballer
José Miguel Cubero (born 1987), Costa Rican footballer
Linda Garcia Cubero (born 1958), first Hispanic woman to graduate from any U.S. military service academy
Pedro Cubero (1645-), Spanish priest and world traveler
Ruben A. Cubero (born 1939), United States Air Force brigadier general
Vicente Aguilar Cubero (1808–1861), Costa Rican politician
Vicente Cubero (guerilla) (1911–1942), Filipino World War II guerilla leader